Table tennis events at the 2022 National Games of India were held from 20 August 2022 to 26 October 2022 at Pandit Deendayal Upadhyay Indoor Stadium, Surat.

Medal table

References

2022 National Games of India
Table tennis in India
2022 in table tennis